The Temple of Pudicitia Plebeia was an ancient Roman temple on the Quirinal Hill, along the Vicus Longus, on what is now via Nazionale. It was dedicated to 'plebeian chastity' and built in 296 BC by Virginia, wife of the future consul Lucius Volumnius, in a section of her own house. 

According to Livy, (10.23.6-10), it was built in opposition to a shrine or temple to Pudicitia Patricia (whose existence is not definite and may be a conflation with the Temple of Fortuna) after the patrician-born Virginia was excluded from the latter after her marriage to a plebeian. Livy states that the cult declined and was forgotten due to women's extreme openness and opposition to the concept of chastity, though Festus in the 2nd century AD stated that its cult was still active.  If still in use by the 4th-and 5th century, it would have been closed during the persecution of pagans in the late Roman Empire.

See also
List of Ancient Roman temples

Bibliography

Filippo Coarelli, Guida archeologica di Roma, Verona, Arnoldo Mondadori Editore, 1984
Lawrence Richardson, Jr., A New Topographical Dictionary of Ancient Rome, JHU Press.

Pudicitia Plebea
Roman temples by deity
3rd-century BC religious buildings and structures